Gordon Enoch Gates (11 January 1897 – 11 June 1987) was an American zoologist.

Biography
Gates was born in Warner, New Hampshire, in 1897.  He graduated from Colby College in 1919.  From 1921 to 1941, he served as the head of Biology Department at Judson College in Burma. Then, from 1941 to 1946 he became a professor of biology at Rangoon College. he was a fellow at Museum of Comparative Zoology from 1946 to 1947, followed by being a Professor of Biology at Colby College from 1948 to 1950. He then became a guggenheim fellow from 1951 to 1952. His main focus was the morphology, physiology, taxonomy, and zoogeography of earthworms, a collection of which he donated to the National Museum of Natural History. He retired from his position in 1952.

References

1897 births
1987 deaths
20th-century American zoologists
Colby College alumni
Academic staff of the University of Yangon
People from Warner, New Hampshire
Harvard University alumni